The Research and Analysis Wing (abbreviated R&AW) is the foreign intelligence agency of India. The agency's primary function is gathering foreign intelligence, counter-terrorism, counter-proliferation, advising Indian policymakers, and advancing India's foreign strategic interests. It is also involved in the security of India's nuclear programme.

During the nine-year tenure of its first Secretary, Rameshwar Nath Kao, R&AW quickly came to prominence in the global intelligence community, playing a role in major events such as accession of the state of Sikkim to India in 1975. Headquartered in New Delhi, R&AW's current chief is Samant Goel. The head of R&AW is designated as the Secretary (Research) in the Cabinet Secretariat, and is under the authority of the Prime Minister of India without parliamentary oversight. On an administrative basis, the Director reports to the Cabinet Secretary, who reports to the Prime Minister.

History

Background (1923–69)
Prior to the inception of the Research and Analysis Wing, overseas intelligence collection was primarily the responsibility of the Intelligence Bureau (IB), which was created by the British Raj. In 1933, sensing the political turmoil in the world which eventually led to the Second World War, the Intelligence Bureau's responsibilities were increased to include the collection of intelligence along India's borders.

In 1947, after independence, Sanjeevi Pillai took over as the first Indian Director of the IB. Having been depleted of trained manpower by the exit of the British after Indian independence, Pillai tried to run the bureau on MI5 lines. In 1949, Pillai organised a small foreign intelligence operation, but the Indian debacle in the Sino-Indian War of 1962 showed it to be ineffective. Foreign intelligence failure during the 1962 Sino-Indian War led then-Prime Minister Jawaharlal Nehru to order a dedicated foreign intelligence agency to be established. After the Indo-Pakistani war of 1965, the Chief of Army Staff, General Joyanto Nath Chaudhuri, also called for more intelligence-gathering. Around the end of 1966 the concept of a separate foreign intelligence agency began to take concrete shape.

Formation of R&AW in 1968 to present

The Indira Gandhi administration decided that a full-fledged second security service was needed. R. N. Kao, then a deputy director of the Intelligence Bureau, submitted a blueprint for the new agency. Kao was appointed as the chief of India's first foreign intelligence agency, the Research and Analysis Wing. The R&AW was given the responsibility for strategic external intelligence, human as well as technical, plus concurrent responsibility with the Directorate-General of Military Intelligence for tactical trans-border military intelligence up to a certain depth across the Line of control (LOC) and the international border.

From its inception R&AW has been criticised for being an agency not answerable to the people of India (R&AW reports to Prime Minister only). Fears arose that it could turn into the KGB of India. Such fears were kept at bay by the R&AW's able leadership (although detractors of R&AW and especially the Janata Party have accused the agency of letting itself be used for terrorising and intimidating opposition during the 1975–1977 Emergency). The main controversy which has plagued R&AW in recent years is over bureaucratisation of the system with allegations about favouritism in promotions, corruption, ego clashes, no financial accountability, inter-departmental rivalry, etc. R&AW also suffers from ethnic imbalances in the officer level. Noted security analyst and former Additional Secretary B. Raman has criticised the agency for its asymmetric growth; "while being strong in its capability for covert action it is weak in its capability for intelligence collection, analysis and assessment. Strong in low and medium-grade intelligence, weak in high-grade intelligence. Strong in technical intelligence, weak in human intelligence. Strong in collation, weak in analysis. Strong in investigation, weak in prevention. Strong in crisis management, weak in crisis prevention."

In the early seventies, its annual budget had risen to  while its personnel numbered several thousand. In 2007, the budget of R&AW is speculated to be as high as 150 million to as low as 100 million.

Additional child agencies
Slowly other child agencies such as the Radio Research Center and the Electronics & Tech. Services were added to R&AW in the 1970s and 1990s. In 1971, Kao had persuaded the Government to set up the Aviation Research Centre (ARC). The ARC's job was aerial reconnaissance. It replaced the Indian Air Force's old reconnaissance aircraft, and by the mid-1970s, R&AW, through the ARC, had high quality aerial pictures of the installations along the Chinese and Pakistani borders.  In the 1970s, the Special Frontier Force moved to R&AW's control, working to train Bengali rebels. In 1977, R&AW's operations and staff were dramatically cut under the premiership of Morarji Desai, which hurt the organization's capabilities with the shutting of entire sections of R&AW, like its Information Division. These cuts were reduced following Gandhi's return. In 2004 Government of India added yet another signal intelligence agency called the National Technical Facilities Organisation (NTFO), which was later renamed as National Technical Research Organisation (NTRO). While the exact nature of the operations conducted by NTRO is classified, it is believed that it deals with research on imagery and communications using various platforms.

Objectives
The present R&AW objectives include:

 Monitoring the political, military, economic and scientific developments in countries which have a direct bearing on India's national security and the formulation of its foreign policy.
 Moulding international public opinion and influence foreign governments.
 Covert Operations to safe guard India's National interests.
 Anti-terror operations and neutralising elements posing a threat to India.

In the past, following the Sino-Indian war of 1962 and due to India's volatile relations with Pakistan, R&AW's objectives had also consisted the following:
 To watch the development of international communism and the schism between the two big communist nations, the Soviet Union and China. As with other countries, both these powers had direct access to the communist parties in India.
 To control and limit the supply of military hardware to Pakistan, from mostly European countries, America and more importantly from China.

Structure and organisation

R&AW has been organised on the lines of the CIA. The head of R&AW is designated Secretary (R) in the Cabinet Secretariat. Most of the previous chiefs have been experts on either Pakistan or China. They also have the benefit of training in either the USA or the UK, and more recently in Israel. The Secretary (R), is under the direct command of the Prime Minister, and reports on an administrative basis to the Cabinet Secretary, who reports to the Prime Minister. Moreover, the National Security Adviser is also regularly briefed by the Secretary (R). Reporting to the Secretary (R) are:
 An Additional Secretary responsible for the Office of Special Operations and intelligence collected from different countries processed by large number of Joint Secretaries, who are the functional heads of various specified desks with different regional divisions/areas/countries: Area one – Pakistan; Area two – China and Southeast Asia; Area three – the Middle East and Africa; and Area four – other countries. Two Special Joint Secretaries, reporting to the Additional Secretary, head the Electronics and Technical Department which is the nodal agency for ETS and the RRC.
 The Directorate General of Security has two important sections – the Aviation Research Centre is headed by one Special Secretary and the Special Services Bureau controlled by two Special Secretaries.
The internal structure of the R&AW is a matter of speculation, but brief overviews of the same are present in the public domain. Attached to the Headquarters of R&AW at Lodhi Road, New Delhi are different regional headquarters, which have direct links to overseas stations and are headed by a controlling officer who keeps records of different projects assigned to field officers who are posted abroad. Intelligence is usually collected from a variety of sources by field officers and deputy field officers; it is either preprocessed by a senior field officer or by a desk officer. The desk officer then passes the information to the Joint Secretary and then on to the Additional Secretary and from there it is disseminated to the concerned end user. R&AW personnel are called "Research Officers" instead of the traditional "agents". There is a sizeable number of female officers in R&AW even at the operational level. In recent years, R&AW has shifted its primary focus from Pakistan to China and have started operating a separate desk for this purpose.

The Joint Intelligence Committee (JIC), under the Cabinet Secretariat, is responsible for coordinating and analysing intelligence activities between R&AW, the Intelligence Bureau and the Defence Intelligence Agency (DIA). In practice, however, the effectiveness of the JIC has been varied. With the establishment of the National Security Council in 1999, the role of the JIC has been merged with the NSC. R&AW's legal status is unusual, in that it is not an "Agency", but a "Wing" of the Cabinet Secretariat. Hence, R&AW is not answerable to the Parliament of India on any issue, which keeps it out of reach of the Right to Information Act.< This exemption was granted through Section 24 read with Schedule II of the act. However, information regarding the allegations of corruption and human rights violations has to be disclosed.

Field formations

R&AW has 10 field formations all over India, known as Special Bureaus. These Bureaus have a area of responsibility targeted towards the countries that share land border with India. They are largely located in major cities near or along the borders:

Armed force

Indian army's covert battalion worked with RAW, it is called as Special group.

Recruitment 

Initially, R&AW relied primarily on trained intelligence officers who were recruited directly. These belonged to the external wing of the Intelligence Bureau. Candidates are mostly recruited from the IPS and few other civil services along with candidates from armed forces of India, the latter being in lesser number though. Later, it began directly recruiting graduates from universities. However owing to allegations of nepotism in appointments, in 1983 R&AW created its own service cadre, the Research and Analysis Service (RAS) to absorb talent from other Group A Civil Services, under the Central Staffing Scheme. Direct recruitment at Class I executive level is from Civil services officers undergoing Foundation course at Lal Bahadur Shastri National Academy of Administration. At the end of the course, it conducts a campus interview. Based on a selection of psychological tests and the interview, candidates are inducted for a lien period of one year. During this period, they have an option of rejoining their parent service (if they wish to) after which they can be permanently absorbed into the Research and Analysis Service. Delhi-based security think tank Institute for Defence Studies and Analyses noted in one of its reports that R&AW suffered from the 'tail-end syndrome' where the 'bottom of the entrance lists' of those qualifying the UPSC examinations were offered jobs. Additionally, recruitment is also by lateral deputation from the Officer corps of Armed Forces or Group A Civil Service Officers. The Civil and Defence Service Officers permanently resign their cadre and join the RAS. However, according to recent reports, officers can return to their parent cadre after serving a specific period in the agency if they wish to. Most of the secretaries have been officers from the IPS and other posts are held by IRS and IFS officers. R&AW also employs a number of linguists and other experts in various fields. The service conditions of R&AW officers are governed by the Research and Analysis Wing (Recruitment, Cadre and Service) Rules, 1975.

Training
Basic training
Basic training commences with 'pep talks' to boost the morale of the new recruit. This is a ten-day phase in which the inductee is familiarised with the real world of intelligence and espionage, as opposed to the spies of fiction. Common usages, tradecraft techniques and classification of information are taught. Financial and economic analysis, space technology, information security, energy security and scientific knowledge is imbibed to the trainees. The recruit is made to specialise in a foreign language and introduced to Geostrategic analysis. Case studies of other agencies like CIA, KGB, ISI, Mossad and MI6 are presented for study. The inductee is also taught that intelligence organisations do not identify who is friend and who is foe, the country's foreign policy does. Basic classroom training in tactics and language are imparted to R&AW officers at the residential Training and Language Institute in Gurgaon. A multi-disciplinary school of economic intelligence is also being set up in Mumbai to train intelligence officers in investigating economic crimes like money laundering for terror purposes etc.

Advanced training
After completing 'Basic Training' the recruit is now attached to a Field Intelligence Bureau (FIB). Their training here lasts for 1–2 years. They are given firsthand experience of what it was to be out in the figurative cold, conducting clandestine operations. During night exercises under realistic conditions, they are taught infiltration and exfiltration. They are also instructed to avoid capture and if caught, how to face interrogation. They will learn the art of reconnoitre, making contacts, and, the numerous skills of operating an intelligence mission. At the end of the field training, the new recruit is brought back to the school for final polishing. Before their deployment in the field, they will be given exhaustive training in the art of self-defence mainly Krav Maga, and the use of technical espionage devices. They are also drilled in various administrative disciplines so that they could take their place in the foreign missions without arousing suspicion. They are now ready to operate under the cover of an Embassy to gather information, set up their own network of informers, moles or operatives as the task may require. Field and arms training is provided in the Indian Military Academy Headquarters at Dehradun. The training model has been criticised as being 'archaic and too police-centric' and not incorporating 'modern technological advances in methods of communication' etc.

Shortage of staff
R&AW has a severe shortage of employees. The number of personnel in 2013 was estimated to be 5,000 personnel. This represents a staff deficit of 40% below sanctioned strength. In 2013, the Hindu reported the organization was short on management level staff by 130 and in specialized areas like technology there was also a huge shortage. In number of cryptanalysts, it was short by approximately 33%. V. Balachandran.”

Functions and methods

The primary mission of R&AW includes intelligence collection via HUMINT, psychological warfare, subversion, sabotage. R&AW maintains active liaison with other agencies and services in various countries. Those agencies include SVR of Russia, Afghanistan's NDS, Israel's Mossad, Germany's BND, the CIA and MI6 have been well-known, a common interest being Pakistan's nuclear programme.

Stations abroad
R&AW has been active in obtaining information and operating through third countries. R&AW offices abroad have limited strength and are largely geared to the collection of military, economic, scientific, and political intelligence. R&AW monitors the activities of certain organisations abroad only insofar as they relate to their involvement with narco terrorist elements and smuggling arms, ammunition, explosives, etc. into India. It does not monitor the activities of criminal elements abroad, which are mainly confined to normal smuggling without any links to terrorist elements.

R&AW officers are posted to Indian diplomatic missions under official cover as diplomats, frequently in the consular wing. The relationship between R&AW and the Ministry of External Affairs has been unstable because they "inhabit different worlds" according to the Times of India.

A task force report prepared by a New Delhi-based security think tank highlighted that R&AW operatives have inadequate non-official cover for overseas operations which 'limits access to spot real targets' and causes issues on handling 'high-value assets'.

Operations and activities
The known activities and operations of R&AW, by country:

Africa

South Africa and Namibia
R&AW trained the intelligence officers of many independent African countries and assisted the anti-apartheid struggles in South Africa and Namibia. Retired R&AW officers were deputed to work in training institutes of intelligence agencies of some African states.

Senegal
R&AW was one of the primary agency that provided the information about Ravi Pujari, being located in Senegal. This information was then provided to Senegalese authorities, that arrested and deported him to India. He was formally arrested at Kempegowda International Airport by Karnataka Police.

Asia

Afghanistan
During the Soviet War in Afghanistan, R&AW had recruited three powerful warlords, including Ahmad Shah Massoud.

In 1996, R&AW had built a 25-bed military hospital at the Farkhor Air Base. This airbase was used by the Aviation Research Centre, the reconnaissance arm of R&AW, to repair and operate the Northern Alliance's aerial support. This relationship was further cemented in the 2001 Afghan war.

After the September 11, 2001 attacks, R&AW provided the intelligence to western countries that there were over 120 training camps operating in Afghanistan and Pakistan, run by a variety of militant groups.

After the Overthrow of Taliban in Afghanistan in 2001, R&AW was the first intelligence agency to determine the extent of the Kunduz airlift.

In 2017, R&AW undertook counter-terrorism operation, described as “unprecedented in its scale and scope”, foiled a major terrorist attack by an Islamic State - Khorasan suicide bomber in New Delhi. The CIA was also involved in this Operation. The militant was later transferred to a US base in Afghanistan for further questioning. The operation spanned 3 countries and involved 80 Research officers.

In November–December 2019, a special exfiltration operation was undertaken by R&AW. At least four Indian nationals working in various parts of Afghanistan, that had been abducted by the Haqqani network, were successfully rescued.

In 2020, 10 MSS Operatives from Xinjiang State Security Department (XSSD) were arrested in Kabul by NDS. During Questioning, one of operative told the interrogators that they were gathering information about al-Qaeda, Taliban and Turkistan Islamic Party in Kunar and Badakhshan provinces, and wanted to assassinate high-level members of TIP. This counter-intelligence operation was undertaken based on a Tip-off by R&AW.

Bangladesh

In the early 1970s, the army of Pakistan launched military crackdown in response to the Bangladesh independence movement. Nearly 10 million refugees fled to India. R&AW was instrumental in the formation of the Bangladeshi guerrilla organisation Mukti Bahini and responsible for supplying information, providing training and heavy ammunition to this organisation. It is also alleged that R&AW planned and executed the 1971 Indian Airlines hijacking as a false flag operation to ban overflight by Pakistani aircraft and disrupt Pakistani troop movement in East Pakistan. Special Frontier Force, then under R&AW actively participated in military operations especially in the Chittagong Hill Tracts. After the war ended in the successful creation of Bangladesh. However, four years later Sheikh Mujibur Rahman was assassinated on 15 August 1975 at his residence. R&AW operatives claimed that they had advance information about Mujibur Rahman's assassination but Sheikh Mujib tragically ignored inputs. He was killed along with much of his family. Later, R&AW successfully thwarted plans of assassinating Sheikh Hasina Wazed, daughter of Mujibur Rahman, by Islamist extremists.

In 1990, R&AW had helped engineer and support a democratic uprising against Mohammed Ershad, thus leading to his resignation. His Pro-Pakistan and Anti-Hindu policy decisions had been considered a threat by Indian government.

In 1991, after Khaleda Zia had won election, India was alarmed over increased harassment of pro-India politicians, large-scale radicalisation and meticulously planned infiltration of trained extremists into Indian territory by Jamaat-e-Islami. JeI had setup several terror training camps located along the border. So in order to stop all this activity, R&AW spontaneously bombed several of its camps and a major ISI safe house, thus dismantling JeI's terror network.

In 1977–97, India took active part in Chittagong Hill Tracts conflict. R&AW trained and financed the rebels of Shanti Bahini.

China
After China tested its first nuclear weapons on 16 October 1964, at Lop Nur, Xinjiang. India and the USA shared a common fear about the nuclear capabilities of China. Owing to the extreme remoteness of Chinese testing grounds, strict secrecy surrounding the Chinese nuclear programme, and the extreme difficulty that an Indian or American would have passing themselves off as Chinese, it was almost impossible to carry out any HUMINT operation. So, the CIA in the late 1960s decided to launch an ELINT operation along with R&AW and ARC to track China's nuclear tests and monitor its missile launches. The operation, in the garb of a mountaineering expedition to Nanda Devi involved Indian climber M S Kohli who along with operatives of Special Frontier Force and the CIA – most notably Jim Rhyne, a veteran STOL pilot – was to place a permanent ELINT device, a transceiver powered by a plutonium battery, that could detect and report data on future nuclear tests carried out by China. The monitoring device was near successfully implanted on Nanda Devi, when an avalanche forced a hasty withdrawal. Later, a subsequent mountain operation to retrieve or replant the device was aborted when it was found that the device was lost. Recent reports indicate that radiation traces from this device have been discovered in sediment below the mountain. However, the actual data is not found

In February 2020, Indian Customs officials detained a Chinese ship from Shanghai Port, at Kandla Port. The ship was bound for Port Qasim in Karachi. It was seized for wrongly declaring an autoclave, which can be used in the launch process of ballistic missiles, as an industrial dryer. This seizure was done on an intelligence tip-off by R&AW.

Fiji

In Fiji, where local Indians were being persecuted by Sitiveni Rabuka, R&AW launched 
an operation involving informants in Australia, New Zealand and UK to successfully oust him from power.

Iran
In August 1991, R&AW undertook a physical surveillance and tracking operation of Indian nationals from Jammu and Kashmir that were taking weapons training in Qom.

Malaysia
Since 2014, R&AW has undertaken numerous identification, physical surveillance and tracking operations,  in Malaysia, targeted towards Khalistani organizations. 
It is only of because such operations that many high-ranking Khalistani militants like Harminder Singh Mintoo, Tara Singh, Kulbir Kaur, Ramandeep Singh etc. have been arrested and deported to India.

In 2020, R&AW had foiled a terrorist plot by a Rohingya cell based in Malaysia.

Maldives

In November 1988, the People's Liberation Organisation of Tamil Eelam (PLOTE), composed of about 200 Tamil secessionist rebels under abdullah luthufi, invaded Maldives. At the request of the president of Maldives, Maumoon Abdul Gayoom, the Indian Armed Forces, with assistance from R&AW, launched a military campaign to throw the mercenaries out of Maldives. On the night of 3 November 1988, the Indian Air Force airlifted the 6th parachute battalion of the Parachute Regiment from Agra and flew them over 2,000 km to Maldives. The Indian paratroopers landed at the airstrip of Hulhule island and restored the Government rule at Malé within a day. The operation, labelled Operation Cactus, also involved the Indian Navy. Swift operation by the military and precise intelligence by R&AW quelled the insurgency.

In 2018–19, R&AW undertook many operations that crippled ISI and MSS intelligence network in Maldives.

Mauritius

In February 1983, Mauritian Prime Minister Anerood Jugnauth requested assistance from Mrs Indira Gandhi in the event of a coup by rival politician Paul Bérenger. In March 1983, Gandhi ordered the Indian Army and Navy to prepare for a military intervention against a possible coup against the Jugnauth government. But the military intervention was put off by Mrs. Gandhi, after a squabble between the Indian Navy and Army, on who would lead the operation. Instead, she chose to task the Research and Analysis Wing's then chief, Nowsher F. Suntook, with supervising a largely intelligence-led operation to reunite the Indian community of Mauritius whose fracturing along ideological and communal lines had allowed Mr. Berenger to mount a political challenge.

Myanmar
During the 1990s, R&AW cultivated Burmese rebel groups and pro-democracy coalitions, especially the Kachin Independence Army (KIA). India allowed the KIA to carry a limited trade in jade and precious stones using Indian territory and even supplied them weapons. It is further alleged that KIA chief Maran Brang Seng met the Secretary(R) in Delhi twice. However, when the KIA became the main source of training and weapons for militant groups in Northeast India, R&AW initiated an operation, code named Operation Leech, to assassinate the leaders of the Burmese rebels as an example to other groups. in 1998, six top rebel leaders, including military wing chief of National Unity Party of Arakans (NUPA), Khaing Raza, were shot dead and 34 Arakanese guerrillas were arrested and charged with gunrunning.

In 1995, in Mizoram along the India–Myanmar border, the 57th Mountain Division of the Indian Army carried out the Operation Golden Bird. The operation was launched because R&AW had provided information that a huge consignment of arms for northern eastern had reached to Cox's Bazar (Bangladesh) and was to be sent to insurgents in Manipur. The arms, as per intelligence were meant for groups in Nagaland and Isak-Muivah group in Manipur. Forces were deployed for counterinsurgency in the states of Manipur and Nagaland. Radio sets and other technological instruments were used to intercepts insurgents messages. On 5 April 1995, the Indian troops captured an insurgent named Hathi Bsrvah, trained by Pakistani ISI near Karachi. By 21 May 1995, the operation was finally called off.

In 2015, R&AW and Military Intelligence of Indian Army provided the intelligence support to 21 Para (SF), for their counter-insurgency operation in Myanmar.

Nepal 
In 1998, Mirza Dilshad Beg, a Nepalese parliamentarian and an ISI informant was assassinated by R&AW.

During 1997–2013, R&AW along with IB carried out multiple operations, in which many militant leaders like Yasin Bhatkal of Indian Mujahideen; Bhupinder Singh Bhuda of Khalistan Commando Force; Tariq Mehmood, Asif Ali, Syed Abdul Karim Tunda, Abu Qasim  of Lashkar-e-Taiba; Fayaz Ahmed Mir of Jaish-e-Mohammed were secretly brought to India.

In 2014, R&W along with DGFI tracked down Indian Mujahideen's top commander, Zia Ur Rehman in Nepal. The operation was executed by DGFI after formal request from India's R&AW and Nepal's law enforcement agencies.

In 2017, it was reported that R&AW had kidnapped a mid-level ISI officer Lt. Col. Mohammed H Zahir from Lumbini. There were reports that Zahir was among the ISI team that had taken part in kidnapping and smuggling of former Indian Navy officer Kulbhushan Jadhav from Chabahar, Iran to Meshkal Pakistan.

Pakistan
During the late 1960s, RAW had infiltrated the highest levels of Pakistani military and political leadership. It even had a Mole inside General Yahya Khan's Office. This mole had also alerted the Indian armed forces, a week before about impending Pakistani Air attack. This alert was correct as Pakistan attacked India on December 3, thus starting the Indo-Pakistani War of 1971.

RAW's most successful legendry spy Ravindra Kaushik espionaged in Pakistan in 1970s. He was from Rajasthan's Sri Ganganagar, Kaushik was a student and an aspiring actor, he use to do acting on stage. He was doing acting in a patriotic play when RAW recruiter spotted this young boy. He joined RAW in 1975 at the age of 23. They trained him, made a disguise identity and sent to Pakistan. In enemy nation he did LLB in Karachi university and joined Pakistani army, eventually he promoted to the rank of major. Amid 1979-83 he passed valuable information to RAW. Due to his this feats then Indian prime minister Indira Gandhi gave him title of "The Black Tiger".

Kahuta is the site of the Khan Research Laboratories (KRL), Pakistan's main nuclear weapons laboratory as well as an emerging centre for long-range missile development. The primary Pakistani missile-material production facility is located at Kahuta, employing gas centrifuge enrichment technology to produce Highly Enriched Uranium (HEU). R&AW first confirmed Pakistan's nuclear programs by analysing the hair samples snatched from the floor of barber shops near KRL; which showed that Pakistan had developed the ability to enrich uranium to weapons-grade quality. R&AW operatives knew about Kahuta Research Laboratories from at least early 1978, when the then Indian Prime Minister, Morarji Desai, accidentally exposed R&AW's operations on Pakistan's covert nuclear weapons program. In an indiscreet moment in a telephone conversation one day, Morarji Desai informed the then Pakistan President, Zia-ul-Haq, that India was aware of Pakistan's nuclear weapons program. According to later reports, acting on this "tip-off", Pakistan's ISI and army eliminated most of R&AW's assets in and around Kahuta.

R&AW received information from one of its informants in a London-based company, which had supplied Arctic-weather gear to Indian troops in Ladakh that some Pakistan paramilitary forces had bought similar Arctic-weather gear. This information was shared with Indian Army which soon launched Operation Meghdoot to take control of Siachen Glacier with around 300 acclimatised troops were airlifted to Siachen before Pakistan could launch any operation resulting in Indian head start and eventual Indian domination of all major peaks in Siachen.

In the mid-1980s, R&AW set up two special units, Counterintelligence Team-X(CIT-X) and Counterintelligence Team-J(CIT-J), the first directed at Pakistan and the second at Khalistani groups. Rabinder Singh, the R&AW officer who later defected to the United States in 2004, helped run CIT-J in its early years. Both these covert units used the services of cross-border traffickers to ferry weapons and funds across the border, much as their ISI counterparts were doing. According to former R&AW official and noted security analyst B. Raman, the Indian counter-campaign yielded results. "The role of our cover action capability in putting an end to the ISI's interference and support of khalistani militants in Punjab, thus completely stopping years of violence and insurgency", he wrote in 2002, "by making such interference prohibitively costly is little known and understood." These covert groups were disbanded during the tenure of IK Gujral and were never restarted. As per B Raman a former R&AW Additional Secretary, these covert groups were successful in keeping a check on ISI and were "responsible for ending the Khalistani insurgency".

During the mid-1990s, R&AW undertook an operation to infiltrate various ISI-backed militant groups in Jammu and Kashmir. R&AW operatives infiltrated the area, collected military intelligence, and provided evidence about ISI's involvement in training and funding separatist groups. R&AW was successful not only in unearthing the links, but also in infiltrating and neutralising the terrorism in the Kashmir valley. It is also credited for creating a split in the Hizb-ul-Mujahideen. Operation Chanakya also marked the creation of pro-Indian groups in Kashmir like the Ikhwan-ul-Muslimeen, Muslim Mujahideen etc. These counter-insurgencies consist of ex-militants and relatives of those slain in the conflict. Ikhwan-ul-Muslimeen leader Kokka Parrey was himself assassinated by separatists.

During the Kargil War, R&AW was also successful in intercepting a telephonic conversation between Pervez Musharraf, the then Pakistan Army Chief who was in Beijing and his chief of staff Lt. Gen. Mohammed Aziz in Islamabad. This tape was later published by India to prove Pakistani involvement in the Kargil incursion.

In 2004, It had come to light that a timely tip-off by R&AW helped foil a third assassination plot against Pakistan's former president, General Pervez Musharraf.

About 2–6 months before 26/11 Mumbai attacks, R&AW had intercepted several telephone calls through SIGINT which pointed at impending attacks on Mumbai Hotels by Pakistan-based terrorists, however there was a coordination failure and no follow up action was taken. Few hours before the attacks, a R&AW technician monitoring satellite transmissions picked up conversations between attackers and handlers, as the attackers were sailing toward Mumbai. The technician flagged the conversations as being suspicious and passed them on to his superiors. R&AW believed that they were worrying and immediately alerted the office of the National Security Advisor. However the intelligence was ignored. Later, just after the terrorists had attacked Mumbai, the technicians started monitoring the six phones used by the terrorists and recorded conversations between the terrorists and their handlers.

During the 2016 Line of Control strike, R&AW played an important role by providing real time and accurate intelligence to operational advisors and planners. It had deployed its human assets closest to the 8 demarcated launch-pads in Pakistan administered Kashmir. It also started Physical Surveillance of Chief of Pakistan army, 10 Corps commander and force commander of Northern Areas.

During 2019 Balakot airstrike, R&AW played an important role by identifying and providing intelligence on Markaz Syed Ahmad Shaheed training camp, to operational planners. It had HUMINT that a large number of terrorists had congregated in the camp.

On 1 March 2022, one of the hijackers of Flight IC 814 flight, Zahoor Mistry, was killed by two bike-borne assailants in Karachi. It was Mystery who had killed one of the passengers, 25-year-old Rupin Katyal, on the flight. It is widely believed he was assassinated by R&AW.

Saudi Arabia
Since 1990s, Given its position as the largest source of funds and promoter of Salafist ideology and being considered major security challenge for India. R&AW has greatly expanded its activities and operation in Saudi Arabia. Abdul Karim Tunda was captured in Saudi Arabia and was secretly brought to India.

Since 2012, R&AW has carried out numerous operations in Saudi Arabia. It is only because of such operations that dozens of high-ranking terrorists like Abu Jundal, Habibur Rahman, Sabeel Ahmed, Muhammed Gulnawaz etc. have been deported and arrested in India.

Sri Lanka
In the late 1980s, R&AW allegedly started funding and training LTTE to keep a check on Sri Lanka, which had helped Pakistan in the Indo-Pak War by allowing Pakistani ships to refuel at Sri Lankan ports. However, when LTTE created a lot of problems and complications for India, R&AW switched sides and started providing intelligence support to Sri Lanka. When Prime Minister of India Rajiv Gandhi was forced to send the Indian Peace Keeping Force (IPKF) under Operation Pawan in 1987 to restore normalcy in the region. The disastrous mission of the IPKF was blamed by many on the lack of coordination between the IPKF and R&AW. Its most disastrous manifestation was the Heliborne assault on LTTE HQ in the Jaffna University campus in the opening stages of Operation Pawan. The dropping paratroopers became easy targets for the LTTE. A number of soldiers were killed. The assassination of Rajiv Gandhi  ended India's involvement in Sri Lankan Civil war.

In 2010, R&AW carried out a snatch operation in Sri Lanka, in which a top HuJI militant Sheikh Abdul Khawaja – handler of the 26/11 Mumbai terror attackers was captured and secretly taken away to India.

In 2015, it was allegedly reported by the Sri Lankan newspaper The Sunday Times, that R&AW had played a role in uniting the opposition, to bring about the defeat of Mahinda Rajapaksa. There had been growing concern in the Indian government, on the increasing influence of economic and military rival China in Sri Lankan affairs. Rajapaksa further upped the ante by allowing 2 Chinese submarines to dock in 2014, without informing India, in spite of a stand still agreement to this effect between India and Sri Lanka. The growing Chinese tilt of Rajapaksa was viewed by India with unease. Further, it was alleged, that R&AW's Chief of Station in Colombo, helped coordination of talks within the opposition, and convincing former PM Ranil Wickremasinghe not to stand against Rajapaksa, but to choose a common opposition candidate, who had better chances of winning. The Station chief was also alleged to have been in touch with Chandrika Kumaratunga, who played a key role in convincing Maithripala Sirisena to be the common candidate. However these allegations were denied by the Indian Government and the Sri Lankan Foreign Minister Mangala Samaraweera.

Before the 2019 Easter bombings, R&AW had issued precision intelligence warnings to its Sri Lankan counterpart about an impending terrorist attack. All of these warnings were based on HUMINT gathered by it.

In 2019, R&AW was also able to infiltrate Chinese PLA communication to their attache to Sri Lanka. It was because of this that Post of Chinese defence attache was vacant for nearly 8–9 months, as attache was called back after Chinese had learned of this infiltration.

Tajikistan
In the mid-1990s, after the rise of Pakistan backed Taliban in Afghanistan, India started supporting the Northern Alliance. In order to provide support, India had acquired Farkhor Air Base. This airbase was used by R&AW, along with M.I., as a base of operations for all their activities directed to Afghanistan like covert paramilitary operations and HUMINT gathering. The airbase was also used by Aviation Research Centre and DAI, to provide aerial reconnaissance to Northern Alliance.

Turkey
During the 2015 G20 Antalya summit, the R&AW station in Ankara increased its strength in order to provide additional security cover for visiting PM Modi, along with SPG. Officers from MI5 and Mossad were also deployed to provide Security as part of liaison agreement.

Europe

Belgium
In 2021, R&AW is reported to have foiled an assassination plot hatched by Khalistan Commando Force militants from Belgium and United Kingdom, to target farmers' leader protesting at Delhi.

Germany
Since 2014, R&AW has undertaken numerous physical surveillance, identification and tracking operations in Germany, targeted towards Khalistani militants and Islamic fundamentalists. It has aggressively recruited agents inside pro-Khalistan circles all across Germany, in cities like Frankfurt and Berlin.

The latest surveillance operation was undertaken in 2019, with target being Gurmeet Singh Bagga, co-leader of the Khalistan Zindabad Force and a fugitive wanted for the Punjab drone Arms drop Case.

R&AW had also managed to extract certain technical knowledge necessary for UAV flight controls, in order to advance India's Indigenous Military UAV program.

Italy
After 26/11, it was uncovered that Pakistan's ISI had not only laundered large amount of money for the attack but also arranged VOIP calls that allowed the handlers to talk to the militants through the Italian city of Brescia.

So in order to counter these activities,  R&AW established a new station in Rome.
Since then, it has undertaken hundreds of operations, directed towards Sleeper cells/operatives of Pakistan-based Islamic and Khalistani militant organizations. It has also aggressively recruited agents inside Pro-Khalistan circles all across Italy

United Kingdom

During 1980s, R&AW launched an extensive operation in London to neutralise UK-based Pakistani national Abdul Khan, who had played an instrumental role in sheltering extremists and planning attacks in India.

Since the suppression and defeat of Khalistani insurgency in late 1990s, R&AW has greatly expanded its informant network inside Khalistani circles and associations in the UK. Wanted Khalistanis like Paramjeet Singh Pamma and Kuldeep Singh Chaheru have been living in UK since they fled in 1992, thus necessitating increased R&AW presence.

North America

Canada
Kanishka Bombing case: On 23 June 1985 Air India's Flight 182 was blown up near Ireland and 329 people died. On the same day, another explosion took place at Tokyo's Narita airport's transit baggage building where baggage was being transferred from Cathay Pacific Flight No CP 003 to Air India Flight 301 which was scheduled for Bangkok. Both aircraft were loaded with explosives from Canadian airports. Flight 301 got saved because of a delay in its departure. This was considered as a major setback to R&AW for failing to gather enough intelligence about the Khalistani militants.

In April 2020, it was reported that R&AW and IB had launched an extensive operation in 2009–2015, to influence the Canadian government and politicians into supporting India's interests.
Canada has long being accused by India  for being a safe haven for khalistani separatists.

In July 2020, Canada had put two Sikh men under No-fly list after Canadian Security Intelligence Service had gotten information, that both were going travel to Pakistan and carry out a ISI-backed terrorist attack inside India. One of the separatists was identified as the son of Lakhbir Singh Rode, a well known Khalistani terrorist.
The Information was provided by R&AW under the liaison relationship.

Corruption cases
 In the edition of 8 February 2010 Outlook Magazine reported on former R&AW Chief, Ashok Chaturvedi, using Government of India funds to take his wife along on international trips. After retirement, Chaturvedi had a diplomatic passport issued for himself and his wife. Per Outlook Magazine: "Only grade 'A' ambassadors—usually IFS officers posted in key countries like the UK and US—are allowed to hold diplomatic passports after retirement. The majority, who do not fit that bill, hold passports issued to ordinary citizens. In fact, all former R&AW chiefs Outlook spoke to confirmed they had surrendered their diplomatic passports the day they retired. And their spouses weren't entitled to diplomatic passports even while they were in service."
 In September 2007, R&AW was involved in a controversy due to a high-profile CBI raid at the residence of Major General (retired) V K Singh, a retired Joint Secretary of R&AW who has recently written a book on R&AW where it was alleged that political interference and corruption in the intelligence agency has made it vulnerable to defections. One of the instances of corruption mentioned in the book was the preference given by R&AW departments towards purchasing intelligence from the Rohde and Schwarz company. A reason for such corruption as explained by the author is that "...R&AW was not answerable to any outside agency – the control of the Prime Minister's Office was perfunctory, at best – many officers thought that they were not only above the law but a law unto themselves." A case under the Official Secrets Act has also been filed against V K Singh.
 On 19 August 2008 the R&AW Director (Language) who was also head of the R&AW Training Institute in Gurgaon from 2005 tried to commit suicide in front of Prime Minister's Office, alleging inaction and wrong findings to a sexual harassment complaint filed against a Joint Secretary, who was on deputation to R&AW. She was discharged from duty on the ground that she was mentally unfit and that her identity was disclosed. She was later separately charged with criminal trespass, human trafficking and for her repeated attempts to commit suicide. The Central Administrative Tribunal (CAT) ordered R&AW to reinstate her however R&AW filed an appeal against the CAT order which is pending before Delhi High Court. On 20 January 2011 she was sent for psychological evaluation and medical detention by a Delhi High Court judge when she tried to strip herself in the court protesting over the slow pace of her trial. The psychological evaluation report stated that 'she may be suffering a mental problem due to loss of job and her continuous run-ins at the courts, but she was certainly not suffering from any permanent or grave mental disorder.' On 15 December 2014, the Supreme Court of India quashed the 2008 media release, which proclaimed Ms. Bhatia as mentally unstable, on the ground that it affected the "dignity, reputation and privacy of a citizen".
 A senior technical officer was arrested by CBI on graft charges, on 4 February 2009. The scientist, a Director level employee, worked in the division that granted export licenses to companies dealing in "sensitive" items, including defence-related equipment. He was accused of demanding and accepting a bribe of ₹ 100,000 from a Chennai based manufacturer for obtaining an export license.
 In September 2009, seven Additional Secretaries from the RAS cadre had gone on protest leave after A. B. Mathur, an IPS officer, superseded them to the post of Special Secretary. Over the years the tussle between the RAS cadre and officers on deputation from IPS cadre has caused friction in the working of the agency.

Defections and spy scandals
 In the early 1980s, K.V. Unnikrishnan, a 1962 batch IPS officer, who was posted at R&AW station in Colombo was honey-trapped by CIA. Between 1985 and 1987 when he was deputed as the station chief at Chennai, coordinating Sri Lanka operations, he gave away information to his handler on training and arming Tamil groups including LTTE, the Indian government's negotiating positions on the peace accord with Sri Lanka and the encryption code used by the agency. He was caught by IB counter-intelligence in 1987, spent a year in Tihar jail and was dismissed from IPS cadre.
 In 2004, there was a spy scandal involving the CIA. Rabinder Singh, Joint Secretary and the head of R&AW's South East Asia department, defected to America on 5 June 2004. R&AW had already become suspicious about his movements and he was under surveillance for a very long time. Soon he was confronted by Counter Intelligence officials on 19 April 2004. Despite all precautions, Rabinder Singh managed to defect with 'sensitive files' he had allegedly removed from R&AW's headquarters in south New Delhi. This embarrassing fiasco and national security failure were attributed to weak surveillance, shoddy investigation, and lack of coordination between the Counter Intelligence and Security, Intelligence Bureau (IB) and R&AW. According to unconfirmed reports, Singh has surfaced in Virginia, USA. Recently in an affidavit submitted to the court, R&AW deposed that Singh has been traced in New Jersey. It has been speculated in the book Mission R&AW that although the CIA was found directly involved in compromising Singh and Unnikrishnan, at least eight other R&AW officers managed to clandestinely migrate and settle in foreign countries like the US and Canada with the help of their spy agencies.
 In 2007, there was a spy scandal involving Bangladesh. A Bangladeshi DGFI agent concealed his nationality before joining R&AW, and was known by the name of Diwan Chand Malik in the agency. He was known to have some important intel which was damaging for the national security. He joined the agency in 1999 and used to live in East Delhi. A case of cheating and forgery was filed against him at the Lodhi Colony police station on the basis of a complaint by a senior R&AW official.
 On 25 March 2016, Pakistan claimed that they arrested a R&AW operative by the name of Kulbhushan Jadhav who was operating in Balochistan province under the covername Hussain Mubarak Patel. Pakistan claimed that he was carrying a passport under that fake identity and used to operate a jewellery shop in Chahbahar, Iran. He is believed to be a serving commander-ranked officer in Indian Navy. According to a section of Pakistani media, he was involved in terrorist incidents in Karachi and Balochistan, most notably the terrorist attack on a bus full of Shia passengers in Safoora Goth, Karachi. However, Indian MEA said that though Jadhav was an Indian Navy officer who retired prematurely, but he has no link with the government. The Indian High Commission has also sought consular access to Jadhav but Pakistan has not agreed to it  and Pakistan leaked some information without realising glaring loopholes in the same. The Iranian President Hassan Rouhani also dismissed Pakistan's claim and stated them as mere rumours. According to an Indian official, Jadhav owns a cargo business in Iran and had been working out of Bandar Abbas and Chabahar ports. "It appears that he strayed into Pakistani waters. But there is also a possibility that he was lured into Pakistan sometime back and fake documents were created on him.

List of R&AW Secretaries

Most of the Secretaries of Research and Analysis Wing have been Indian Police Service (IPS) officers. R. N. Kao and K. Sankaran Nair belonged to the Imperial Police (IP), of the British colonial days which was renamed as the Indian Police Service after Indian Independence in 1947. N. F. Suntook had served in the Indian Navy, then in the Indian Police Service and in the Indian Frontier Administration Service. Vikram Sood was from the Indian Postal Service (IPoS)and was later permanently absorbed in the RAS cadre. Now he acts as Advisor to Fair Observer. A. S. Dulat was an Indian Police Service officer deputed from the Intelligence Bureau. All the chiefs have been experts on China or Pakistan except for Ashok Chaturvedi, who was an expert on Nepal.

In popular culture

Unlike in the Western cultural sphere, which has portrayed its foreign intelligence agencies (such as the CIA and MI6) in different media forms, Indian authors and actors have been shy to explore the area of espionage, especially R&AW, until the 1990s. Unlike CBI, the federal investigative agency of India, whose existence is known to the majority of people, R&AW receives little to no attention from the populace, which seems to be unaware of the existence of such an organisation or even India's internal intelligence agency, the Intelligence Bureau (IB). Excessive secrecy surrounding activities and rare declassification of the information is considered to be the major reasons behind this.
Nevertheless, there were films which refer to 'agents' and 'espionage', like Aankhen (1968, Ramanand Sagar Production, starring Dharmendra, Mala Sinha), Prem Pujari starring Dev Anand in 1970, Hindustan Ki Kasam (starring Raaj Kumar, Priya Rajvansh in 1973) and Highway (starring Suresh Gopi, Bhanupriya) including some modern films such as Romeo Akbar Walter in 2019. However, since the late 1990s and early 2000 the following Bollywood and other regional films have openly mentioned R&AW and its allied units, with the intelligence agencies at the centre of the plot.

The thriving entertainment channels in India have started to tap into the theme of Intelligence agencies. 2612 which used to air on Life OK, featured Cabir Maira as a R&AW agent Anand Swami who helps an STF officer Randeep Rathore to save the country from a terrorist attack. Time Bomb 9/11, a series aired on Zee TV, featured Rajeev Khandelwal in the role of a R&AW field officer who attempts to defuse a nuclear bomb set in India, as well as saving the life of the Indian prime minister. Zee Bangla featured a serial named Mohona where the chief protagonist is a R&AW officer. Sajda Tere Pyar Mein a series on Star Plus, features Shaleen Bhanot in the role of a R&AW officer who asks a young woman named Aliya for help in catching a spy named Mahendra Pratap. The Indian version of 24 has a host of characters affiliated with R&AW. The 2018 web series Sacred Games has a R&AW agent played by Radhika Apte. Foreign films which have actors playing R&AW agents include Pakistan-based-films such as Waar (2013).

Some academic commentators have linked the increasing surfeit of Indian films and TV series on espionage thriller genre, where an Indian hero staves off impending global catastrophe, as a marker of an aspirational Pax Indica not based on 'older paradigms of internationalism based on universal brotherhood and non-violent pacifism associated with Gandhi and Nehru' but on the motif of an increasingly assertive potential superpower.

See also
 Intelligence Bureau (India)
 Central Bureau of Investigation
 Mass surveillance in India
 List of Indian intelligence agencies

Notes

References

Further reading

 Inside RAW, Ashok Raina, Vikas Publishing House, New Delhi, 1981
 Smash and grab: Annexation of Sikkim, Sunanda K Datta-Ray, Tranquebar, 1984 
 Open Secrets: India's Intelligence Unveiled – Maloy Krishna Dhar, New Delhi, Manas Publication, 2005 
 Mission to Pakistan: An Intelligence Agent in Pakistan Maloy Kri. Dhar, Manas Publication, 1 January 2002, 
 Mission: Pakistan, Maloy Krishna Dhar, iUniverse (January 2004), 
 Fulcrum of Evil: ISI, CIA and Al qaeda Nexus – Maloy K Dhar, New Delhi, Manas Publication, 2006, .
 Sin of National conscience – R.N. Kulkarni, Mysore: Kritagnya Publication, 2004.
 Intelligence: Past, Present, Future – B.R. Raman
 Indians Hand Evidence on bin Laden to US, Herald Sun, 17 September 2001.
 The KaoBoys of RAW: Down Memory Lane, B. Raman, Lancer Publishers (2007), 
 , K. Sankaran Nayar, Manas Publication
 RAW: Global and Regional Ambitions edited by Rashid Ahmad Khan and Muhammad Saleem, Islamabad Policy Research Institute, Asia Printers, Islamabad, 2005
 The Game Of Foxes: J-K Intelligence War, Manoj Joshi, Times Of India, 16 July 1994
 Indian Spy Agency's Machinations, Islamabad, The Muslim, 18 December 1996 p6
 RAW: Research and Analysis Wing – Tariq Ismail Sagar, Sagar Publication. See also: E-buyer in soup for Pak writer's book on RAW. Retrieved 27 July 2007.
 Soft Target: How the Indian Intelligence Service Penetrated Canada – Zuhair Kashmeri and Brian McAndrew, Toronto: James Lorimer, 1989.
 Spies in the Himalayas: Secret Missions and Perilous Climbs. – MS Kohli and Kenneth Conboy, Ed. KS Lawrence, University of Kansas Press, 2003.
 Intelligence: A Security Weapon, DC Pathak, New Delhi: Manas Publication, 2003.
 Indian intervention in Sri Lanka: The role of India's intelligence agencies, Rohan Gunaratna, South Asian Network on Conflict Research, 1993, 
 India's External Intelligence: Secrets of Research and Analysis Wing (RAW), Maj. Gen. V.K Singh, Manas Publications, 
 
 Assignment Colombo, J.N. Dixit, Konark Publishers Pvt. Ltd, Delhi, 1998.
 Escape To Nowhere, Amar Bhushan, Konark publishers, 2012, 
 Mission R&AW, RK Yadav, Manas Publications, 2014, 
 The Zero-Cost Mission/The Wily Agent, Amar Bhushan, Harper Collins (India), 2018.
 The Spy Chronicles: RAW, ISI and the Illusion of Peace, A.S. Daulat, Aditya Sinha and Asad Durrani, HarperCollins, 2018. 

 
Indian intelligence agencies
Indo-Pakistani War of 1971
Information sensitivity
Foreign intervention in the Sri Lankan Civil War
1968 establishments in Delhi